How to Marry a Millionaire is an American sitcom that aired in syndication and on the 
NTA Film Network from October 7, 1957 to August 20, 1959. The series is based on the 1953 film of the same name starring Marilyn Monroe, Betty Grable, and Lauren Bacall.

The series stars Lori Nelson, Merry Anders, and Barbara Eden. Lisa Gaye joined the cast in the second season after Lori Nelson left the series. How to Marry a Millionaire was one of the first television sitcoms based on a feature film, and was the first series that Barbara Eden was featured in as a regular cast member. Eden would go on to play one of her more notable roles, "Jeannie" in the NBC sitcom I Dream of Jeannie.

Synopsis

Season one
The series follows the adventures and mishaps of three 20-something women who are attempting to marry a rich man. The three women are Greta Hanson (Nelson), a sophisticated, college educated co-hostess of the quiz show Go For Broke; Michelle "Mike" McCall (Anders), an intelligent (and often scheming), wise cracking Wall Street secretary; and Loco Jones (Eden), a ditzy but good-hearted "Miss Magoo"-esque fashion model who, despite having very poor eyesight, refuses to wear her glasses in the presence of men. As in the film, the three women have concocted a scheme to land a rich husband by placing themselves in the same social scene as rich bachelors. The three rent a pricey penthouse apartment together at the Tower House on Park Avenue and vow to help each other land a rich husband. While their address may be ritzy, Greta, Mike and Loco struggle to make the rent, are constantly faced with the threat of eviction and barely make ends meet.

In the series' initial episodes, Dabbs Greer portrayed Mr. Blandish, the Tower House's building manager who frequently threatens the women with eviction due to their failure to pay the rent on time. Midway through the first season, Joseph Kearns was cast as the building manager, Augustus P. Tobey. Mr. Tobey is also regularly annoyed by Greta, Mike and Loco because of their inability to pay the rent on time and is constantly trying to get the women evicted. Also appearing in a recurring role is Jimmy Cross, the building's elevator operator Jesse Flouge who often helps, and sometimes hinders, the women in their millionaire husband landing schemes.

The original, unaired pilot episode was shot in Spring 1957. Lori Nelson appeared as Greta Lindquist (the character's last name was later changed to Hanson), Loco Jones was played by Charlotte Austin and Doe Avedon (ex-wife of photographer Richard Avedon) portrayed Mike McCall. Joseph Kearns, who was later cast in the series as the women's building manager, appeared in the pilot as Mike's co-worker Maurice. After all three major networks passed on the series, National Telefilm Associates and 20th Century-Fox Television (which owned part of the series) sold and distributed the series to 115 independent syndicated channels. 
Millionaire was included in a package deal with two other NTA productions, This Is Alice and Man Without a Gun, that subscribing syndicated channels aired in a programming block on the same night. After the series was sold, Charlotte Austin and Doe Avedon's roles were recast. Approximately seventy actresses auditioned for the roles of Loco and Mike before producers chose Barbara Eden and Merry Anders.

Season two
How to Marry a Millionaire was generally well received by critics and audiences and a second, abbreviated season was ordered. However, Lori Nelson's character was written out and a new character, Gwen Kirby (Lisa Gaye), was added to the cast.  Nelson later said she chose to quit the show stating, "I felt that I was the biggest of the three actresses in terms of star status...I felt that I needed to move on. I didn't need to be stuck in that little series that was in syndication." However, Nelson's co-star Merry Anders said that Nelson was fired. According to Anders, the series' entire first season, 39 episodes, was shot before the series debuted on television. While promoting the series shortly before its debut, Nelson gave an interview in which she reported that she was disappointed with her role. She stated that she felt her role was not as well defined as that of her co-stars, who were more clearly based on their film counterparts (Mike McCall was patterned after Lauren Bacall's role while Barbara Eden's character was a combination of the Betty Grable and Marilyn Monroe role). Anders stated that when the series' production company, National Telefilm Associates, got wind of Nelson's remarks, they fired her.

After Nelson's departure, her character was written out by having her marry a gas station owner and relocating to California. The second-season premiere episode, "Cherchez la Roommate", deals with Loco and Mike trying to find a suitable replacement for Greta or face eviction. Mr. Tobey is delighted that he finally has a legitimate reason to throw the women out and gives them one week to find a new roommate or get evicted. After a disastrous attempt to find a new roommate through a want ad in the newspaper, Loco and Mike are introduced to Gwen Kirby, a new girl in town who needs a place to live. After learning of Mike and Loco's plan to land a rich husband, Gwen agrees  to help with their plan and becomes the third roommate.

After an abbreviated second season consisting of thirteen episodes, How to Marry a Millionaire was canceled.

Cast

Main
 Barbara Eden as Loco Jones
 Merry Anders as Michelle "Mike" McCall
 Lori Nelson as Greta Hansen (Season 1)
 Lisa Gaye as Gwen Kirby (Season 2)

During the series' first season, Eden was billed third. After Lori Nelson left the series, Eden was billed first.

Recurring
 Dabbs Greer as Mr. Blandish
 Joseph Kearns as Augustus P. Tobey
 Jimmy Cross as Jesse Flouge

Notable guest stars
 Morey Amsterdam
 Richard Deacon
 Stacy Keach Sr.
 Werner Klemperer
 Ted Knight
 Charles Lane
 Amanda Randolph
 Vito Scotti
 Willard Waterman

Episodes

Season 1 (1957-1958) 
The first season of How to Marry a Millionaire premiered on October 7, 1957, and ended in July 1958, after 39 episodes.

"The Penthouse" (Pilot)
"Subletting the Apartment"
"The 3 Pretenders" 
"To Hock or Not to Hock"
"It's a Dog's Life" 
"The Cruise"
"The Brat"
"Loco the Heiress"
"Alias the Secretary"
"The Sea Island Story"
"Society Mother"
"Tom, Dick, and Harry"
"Good Time Charlie"
"The Bird Man"
"The Fourth Girl"
"For the Love of Art"
"The Playwright"
"Youth for the Asking"
"Loco Leaves Home"
"The Maid"
"The Yachting Party"
"The Utterly Perfect Man"
"Loco and the Cowboy"
"Loco v. Wall Street"
"For the Love of Mink"
"Operation Greta"
"A Job for Jesse"  
"Day in Court"
"A Man for Mike"
"The Truthivac"
"The New Lease"
"Situation Wanted"
"Loco and the Gambler"
"The Big Order"
"The Shortshop"
"Greta's Big Chance

Season 2 (1958-1959)
The abbreviated second season lasted 13 episodes. The second season aired from October 7, 1958, to August 20, 1959. The series was on hiatus from January to June 1959.

"Cherchez la Roommate"
"What's Cooking with Loco?"
"Guest with a Gun"
"Hit and Run"
"Three Stacked Stockholders"
"Gwen's Secret"
"Loco, the Teenager"
"The Seal Who Came to Dinner"
"The Method"
"The Golf Tournament"
"The Comic"
"A Husband for Julia"
"Love on Approval"

Production notes
How to Marry a Millionaire was one of the first television series filmed by Twentieth Century Fox. The series was executive produced by Nat Perrin and Irving Asher, and produced by Ben Feiner, Jr. and Paul Jones.

Home media
On February 21, 2017, the first season was released on manufactured-on-demand DVD by CBS Home Entertainment. Season two was released on September 18, 2017.

Footnotes

References
 Brooks, Tim; Marsh, Earle F. (2007). The Complete Directory to Prime Time Network and Cable TV Shows, 1946-Present (9 ed.). Ballantine Books. 
 Magers, Boyd; Fitzgerald, Michael G. (2004). Westerns Women: Interviews With 50 Leading Ladies Of Movie And Television Westerns From The 1930s To The 1960s. McFarland. .
 Tucker, David C. (2010). Lost Laughs of '50s and '60s Television: 30 Sitcoms That Faded Off Screen. McFarland. .

External links
 

1957 American television series debuts
1959 American television series endings
1950s American sitcoms
Black-and-white American television shows
English-language television shows
First-run syndicated television programs in the United States
Live action television shows based on films
Television series based on adaptations
Television series by CBS Studios
Television series by 20th Century Fox Television
Television shows set in New York City
Wealth in the United States